Saints and Scroungers is a British television programme about welfare benefits, broadcast on BBC One and presented by Matt Allwright since 2013. It was presented by Dominic Littlewood from 2009 until 2012. But now more recently for the new series started on 7 September 2015, there is no physical presenter input but just an audio voice over from Mark Bazeley. It focuses on two groups of people: the vulnerable who need help and those who help them 'saints' and fraudulent claimants 'scroungers'. The series is repeated in the UK on Crime & Investigation Network.

Transmissions

External links
 
 

2009 British television series debuts
2015 British television series endings
BBC television documentaries
British crime television series
Social security in the United Kingdom